Route 20 (known locally as Lagimodière Boulevard) is a major north-south arterial route in the city of Winnipeg, Manitoba, Canada.  It is also part of Manitoba Highway 59, the only Provincial Trunk Highway (other than the Trans-Canada Highway) that crosses through the city.

Route description
It begins in the northeast, running through the suburb of North Kildonan before becoming the boundary between the suburbs of East Kildonan and Transcona. South of the CNR Redditt line, it enters the eastern section of St. Boniface, passing by the CNR Symington Yards and the Royal Canadian Mint before crossing the Perimeter Highway and leaving the city in the extreme southern part of St. Boniface.

Route 20 maintains expressway standards through Winnipeg, generally as a 4-lane divided route, and has an 80 km/h (50 mph) speed limit for the most part, except for a brief section in the north end at Regent Avenue where the speed limit drops to 70 km/h (45 mph), and a section after the North Kildonan overpass where the speed limit raises to 90 km/h

History
During the 1960s, Highway 59 between the Trans-Canada and the North Perimeter Highways was rebuilt to the east of its original route, which followed what is now Molson Street, Panet Road, Dawson Road, and Speers Road. Following its completion, the newly reconstructed road was named Lagimodière Boulevard, after Jean-Baptiste Lagimodière, an early pioneer of St. Boniface.

Major intersections

References

020